KICC can mean:

 Kavli Institute for Cosmology, Cambridge, a research establishment in Cambridge, England, United Kingdom
 Kentucky International Convention Center, a convention facility in Louisville, Kentucky, United States
 Kenyatta International Convention Centre, a building in Nairobi, Kenya
 Kimberley Institute Cricket Club, a cricket club in Kimberly, England, United Kingdom
 Kingsway International Christian Centre, a church in London, England, United Kingdom
 Kyoto International Conference Center, a conference facility in Sakyō-ku, Kyoto, Japan